= Crossbill Guides Foundation =

The Crossbill Guides Foundation (CGF) is a European non-governmental organization for the conservation of the natural environment that was founded in 2004. It produces guidebooks on major natural areas in Europe, in order to create public awareness and participation in conservation activities.
